Kristin Harila (born in 1986) is a Norwegian mountaineer and former cross-country skier. She has climbed 12 peaks above 8000.

As a cross-country skier she managed to place 44th and 46th in two editions of the Norwegian championships. She represented the club IL Polarstjernen.

Mountain climbing career
Harila climbed Mount Everest and Mount Lhotse in less than twelve hours to become the fastest woman to do so. She has ascended 12 out of 14 peaks.
Annapurna I – 28 April 2022
Dhaulagiri I – 8 May 2022
Kanchenjunga – 14 May 2022
Mount Everest – 23 May 2021, 22 May 2022
Lhotse – 23 May 2021, 22 May 2022
Makalu – 27 May 2022
Nanga Parbat – 1 July 2022
K2 – July 2022
Broad Peak – 28 July 2022
Gasherbrum II – 8 August 2022
Gasherbrum I – 11 August 2022
Manaslu - 22 September 2022

See also
Nirmal Purja

References

Norwegian cross-country skiers
1986 births
Living people
Norwegian mountain climbers